Players denoted in boldface  are still actively contributing to the record noted.

(r) denotes a player's rookie season.

1800+ career runs scored

Active players with 1500+ runs scored
(as of through 2021)

Top 10 career runs scored leaders by league

155 runs scored in one season

Seven or more seasons with 120 runs scored

Five or more consecutive seasons with 120 runs scored

Eleven or more seasons with 100 runs scored

Nine or more consecutive seasons with 100 runs scored

League leader in runs scored, 5 or more seasons

League leader in runs scored, 3 or more consecutive seasons

League leader in runs scored, both leagues

League leader in runs scored, three different teams

6 runs scored by an individual in one game

1000 runs scored by a team in one season

One or more runs scored in each inning of a game

Notes
 Ted Williams did not play 1943–45 due to military service in World War II.
 The Chicago Colts, New York Giants, 1964 St. Louis Cardinals and 1999 Colorado Rockies accomplished their feats on the road, meaning they scored in all 9 innings they batted and are the sole instances of a team scoring a run in 9 innings. All remaining teams accomplished this feat at home, meaning they only scored in all 8 innings they batted.
 Game 1 of a doubleheader.

References

See also
 Run (baseball)

Runs
Runs records